The Polish–Swedish War of 1626–1629 was the fourth stage (after 1600–1611, 1617–1618, and 1620–1625) in a series of conflicts between Sweden and Poland fought in the 17th century. It began in 1626 and ended four years later with the Truce of Altmark and later at Stuhmsdorf with the Treaty of Stuhmsdorf.

Course

1626
The first encounter of the war took place near Wallhof, Latvia, where a Swedish army of 4,900 men under Gustavus II Adolphus ambushed a Polish-Lithuanian force of 2,000 men under Jan Stanisław Sapieha. Polish-Lithuanian casualties amounted to between 500 and 1000 dead, wounded and captured. The Lithuanian commander later suffered a nervous breakdown.

In May 1626 King Gustavus Adolphus launched his invasion of Polish Prussia. Escorted by a fleet of over 125 ships, Swedish forces numbering over 8,000 soldiers (including 1,000 cavalry) disembarked in Ducal Prussia near Piława (Pillau). The landings were a complete surprise to the Polish–Lithuanian Commonwealth's defences, and despite his relatively small forces, Gustavus Adolphus quickly captured 16 Prussian towns, almost without a fight (with the neutral Duchy of Prussia's passive support). Many of these towns were inhabited by Protestants and they opened their gates freely to the Lutheran Swedish forces, who they saw as co-religionists. The Swedish king, however, failed to capture the largest prize - the city of Danzig (Gdańsk), which maintained its own small army and fleet for defence. In preparation for his major attack on Danzig, King Gustavus Adolphus increased his forces to over 22,000. The Polish king, Sigismund III, received no support from his vassal, Ducal Prussia, when fighting to defend it. He deployed north with an army of 11,000 men and pitched battle at Gniew against King Gustavus Adolphus' force of 8,150 infantry, 1,750 cavalry and 74 cannon. The fighting continued for several days - from 22 September to 1 October 1626 - until Sigismund III withdrew his army, and called on reinforcements from around the country.

The Polish hetman (historical army rank equivalent to field marshal) Stanisław Koniecpolski quickly came to his king's aid with a force of 4,200 light cavalry, 1,000 dragoons, and 1,000 infantry. In early November the king handed him command of the army. With further reinforcements Koniecpolski soon had 10,000 men to match the 20,000 Swedish troops in Prussia. Engaging in a war of maneuver - small mobile units striking at the enemy's lines of communication - Hetman Koniecpolski managed to halt any further Swedish advances, even forcing the Swedes onto the defensive.

In the meantime, the Sejm (Commonwealth Parliament) agreed to raise funds for the war, but the situation of the Polish forces was difficult. Lithuanian forces were dealt a serious defeat in December 1626 near Kokenhusen in Livonia and retreated behind the Dvina river.

1627

Hetman Koniecpolski recaptured the town of Puck on 2 April 1627. The Swedes planned to strike at Koniecpolski from two directions — Oxenstierna from direction of the Vistula and Johann Streiff von Lauenstein and Maximilian Teuffel from Swedish-held Pomerania. The flooding of the Vistula disrupted their plans and allowed Koniecpolski to intercept the enemy units coming from neighboring Pomerania. In mid-April, Koniecpolski (with 2,150 hussars, 3,290 cossack cavalry, 2,515 western infantry, 1,620 Polish infantry, 1,265 dragoons and 2,000 Ukrainian Cossacks) surrounded a Swedish force inside the town of Czarne (Hammerstein).Three days later the Swedes surrendered, leaving behind their banners and standards. Many of the Swedish troops, who were predominantly newly raised German mercenaries, changed sides to the Commonwealth. This victory also convinced George William, Elector of Brandenburg to declare his support for King Sigismund III.

At the beginning of June 1627, King Gustavus Adolphus was lightly wounded while attempting a night-crossing of the River Vistula in a boat near (Kieżmark), south of Danzig (Gdańsk), and had to retreat. In July he led a force to lift the siege of Braniewo, and lay siege to Orneta (Wormditt). Hetman Koniecpolski responded with the sudden attack and capture of Gniew. Gustavus Adolphus was reported to have been impressed by the speed of Koniecpolski's reaction. Later at the Battle of Dirschau (modern Tczew), Koniecpolski with about 7,800 men (including 2,500 cavalry and hussars), tried to stop the Swedish army (10,000 men including 5,000 infantry) from reaching Danzig. A major battle was fought between 17 and 18 August 1627 (in the new style calendar), with the Swedish forces positioned near the marshes of the River Motława. The Swedes hoped to provoke the Poles into a reckless attack and then to destroy them with infantry fire and artillery, but Koniecpolski decided otherwise. The Swedes then took the initiative and attacked with cavalry, and managed to deal severe damage to the Polish cavalry, but failed to inflict a crippling blow on the main body of the army (the morale of which remained high, mostly thanks to Koniecpolski). When, King Gustavus Adolphus was shot in the shoulder by a Polish sniper, the Swedes decided to end the assault and withdrew from the field, reportedly in good order.

Stanislaw Koniecpolski decided to take the war to the seas and gathered a small Polish–Lithuanian Commonwealth Navy of 9 ships, mostly with aid from the City of Danzig. He defeated a Swedish flotilla on 27 or 28 November 1627 (in the New Style calendar), at the battle of Oliwa near Danzig.

Over the winter, Koniecpolski recognised the need to reform the Polish army, especially to strengthen the firepower of his infantry and artillery to match the Swedish units. The Swedes, for their part, learned from the Poles how to best employ their cavalry by using more aggressive tactics.

1628
In 1628 the Polish forces, lacking funding, were forced to stop their offensive and switch to defense.  Swedish forces captured the towns of Nowy and Brodnica. Hetman Koniecpolski counterattacked by using his small forces most efficiently — fast cavalry melee attacks combined with the supporting fire of infantry and artillery, and using fortifications and terrain advantage. By that time the war had become a war of maneuver, with neither side willing to face the other without advantages of terrain or fortifications. It was a miserable year for Swedish occupying garrison troops, with epidemics wiping out huge numbers of men and horses.

1629
On 2 February, while King Gustavus Adolphus was wintering in Sweden and Hetman Koniecpolski was away in Warsaw, the Polish forces were badly defeated at Górzno, where a Swedish force under Field Marshal Herman Wrangel encountered a Polish army under Stanisław Potocki. The Poles suffered 700 dead and wounded plus 600 captured; the Swedes lost only 30 dead and 60 wounded. 
Hearing of the defeat, the Polish Sejm was persuaded to increase funds for the army and accepted military aid from the Holy Roman Empire in the form of a corps of imperial troops under Field Marshal Hans Georg von Arnim-Boitzenburg. Another imperial corps, commanded by Albrecht von Wallenstein, operated in nearby Pomerania. Nonetheless, Koniecpolski was forced to withdraw from several strategic strongholds in Polish Prussia: in time he managed to recapture the seaport of Putzig (now Puck).

The Swedish king returned to Polish Prussia with substantial reinforcements in May, and marched south towards Graudenz (Grudziądz) hoping to cut-off Arnim's newly arrived imperial corps before it could join Koniecpolski. He was unsuccessful, and while withdrawing north towards Swedish garrisons in Stuhm (Sztum) and Marienburg (Malbork) he was drawn into battle on 27 June 1629 at Honigfeld(t) or Honigfelde near Stuhm, in an action known to the Poles as the Battle of Trzciana. In this encounter, while attempting to cover the withdrawal of his infantry, Swedish cavalry were subjected to a series of fierce engagements at the villages of Honigfeldt, Straszewo and Pułkowice. With the aid of Arnim's heavy cuirassiers the Poles with their faster 'winged' hussars and cossack mercenaries were able to gain a great advantage over the light Swedish horsemen. Swedish losses in the fight were heavy, amounting to 600 or 700 killed, almost all of which were cavalry (including Herman Wrangel's son). The Polish took 300 prisoners, 10-15 standards, as well as 10 of Gustavus Adolphus' famous leather cannon. Commonwealth losses were under 300 killed and wounded. The Swedish king himself barely escaped with his life and later said he had never taken "such a hot bath".

Outcome

The Polish victory at Honigfeld was not followed up by Sigismund III, who wanted to sign a truce only under the condition of Gustav Adolf renouncing the crown of Sweden. Sigismund III never gave up trying to regain the Swedish crown and his son Władysław IV continued after him. Despite all of Koniecpolski's brilliant efforts, a ceasefire in Stary Targ (Truce of Altmark) on 26 September 1629 was in favour of the Swedes, to whom Poland ceded the larger part of Livonia together with its important port of Riga. The Swedes also got the right to tax Poland's trade on the Baltic (3.5% on the value of goods), and kept control of many of the cities in Royal and Ducal Prussia (including Piława (Pillau), Memel and Elbląg (Elbing). For the time being, the Swedes were generally recognized as the dominant power on the southern coast of the Baltic Sea. It was a shortcoming of Poland's diplomatic efforts, not of its army. The Duchy of Prussia was compensated for the partial Swedish occupation with the Commonwealth's temporary (until 1634) transfer of Marienburg, Stuhm  and Żuławy Wiślane. The Commonwealth fleet's surviving ships were transferred to Sweden. The Swedes’ only major failure was their inability to capture the important port of Danzig. Gustav Adolf's biographer, Harte, noted that the king was furious "that a pacific commercial rabble should beat a set of illustrious fellows, who made fighting their profession". Nonetheless, Sweden now controlled almost all the Baltic's ports; with the notable exceptions of Danzig, Putzig, Königsberg and Liepāja (Libau). This would be the closest the Swedes ever got to realising their goal of making the Baltic Sea 'Sweden's inner lake'. After the treaty, Sweden used their prizes and money as a starting point for their entry into the Thirty Years' War and commenced the invasion of northern Germany.

The Treaty of Altmark was eventually revised in the Commonwealth's favour in 1635 (Treaty of Sztumska Wieś or Treaty of Stuhmsdorf), when Sweden, with the death of the king Gustav Adolph in 1632, was weakened by its losses in the Thirty Years' War, retreated from some of the Baltic ports and stopped collecting the 3.5% tax.

See also

References

External links 
 Swedish-Polish War, 1620-1629

1620s conflicts
Military history of Prussia
Swedish Livonia
Wars involving the Polish–Lithuanian Commonwealth
Wars involving Sweden
Poland–Sweden relations
Lithuania–Sweden relations
Warfare of the Early Modern period
1626 in Sweden
17th century in Latvia
1626 in the Polish–Lithuanian Commonwealth
1626 in the Holy Roman Empire
Wars involving the Holy Roman Empire